USC Bassam is an Ivorian football club. They play at Stade Municipal de Bassam.

Honours
Côte d'Ivoire Premier Division: 0

Côte d'Ivoire Cup: 0

Coupe de la Ligue de Côte d'Ivoire: 1
 2020.

Félix Houphouët-Boigny Cup: 0

Football clubs in Ivory Coast
Sport in Comoé District
Sports clubs in Ivory Coast
Sud-Comoé